Guantanamera is a 1995 comedy film from Cuba, directed by Tomás Gutiérrez Alea and Juan Carlos Tabío, featuring an ensemble cast. Screenplay by Eliseo Alberto and others. The film was produced by Camilo Vives.

Synopsis

When Aunt Yoyita dies during a visit to Gina in Guantánamo, Gina, along with Yoyita's childhood sweetheart, the aging Cándido, must take the body to Havana. To their annoyance, Gina's overbearing husband Adolfo, a punctilious undertaker with political ambitions, takes charge of the journey, including several transfers along the way between hearses.

On the road, they keep crossing paths with Mariano, a playboy trucker with a woman at every way station. He and Gina recognize each other: he was her student and wrote her of how much he loved her, then dropped out of school in embarrassment. Before they reach Havana, Gina realizes she can choose between Adolfo and Mariano.

Besides being a romantic comedy, the film is noted for depicting life in Cuba during the "Special Period" of the 1990s, a period of relative poverty for Cuba following the termination of Soviet aid to the country. The male protagonist, for example, was an engineer under the Soviet-supported regime, and now makes a living as a truck driver.

Cast

 Mirta Ibarra ... Gina 
 Carlos Cruz ... Adolfo 
 Jorge Perugorría ... Mariano 
 Conchita Brando ... Yoyita
 Raúl Eguren ... Candido

The film is named after the song Guantanamera ("girl from Guantánamo") – perhaps the best known Cuban song and that country's most noted patriotic song.

It was Gutiérrez's last film.

See also 
 List of Cuban films

References

External links
 

1995 films
Cuban comedy films
Films set in Cuba
1990s Spanish-language films
1990s comedy road movies
1995 comedy films
Films directed by Tomás Gutiérrez Alea
Films directed by Juan Carlos Tabío
Lionsgate films